The Woodforest Bank Stadium is an outdoor Football stadium and natatorium located in Shenandoah, Texas.  The stadium is the home to the Oak Ridge High School War Eagles, Grand Oaks High School Grizzlies, The Woodlands High School Highlanders, and The Woodlands College Park High School Cavaliers. The stadium was home to the Houston Dutch Lions from 2013-2019.

Woodforest National Bank (based in the nearby development of The Woodlands, Texas) bought the rights to the name for $1 million from Conroe Independent School District, the stadium's owner.

In 2018 and 2019, Woodforest Bank Stadium was the site of the NCAA Division III Football Championship.  The University of Mary Hardin-Baylor was the host institution in 2019.

References

External links
Woodforest Bank Stadium Info

Sports venues in Texas
Soccer venues in Texas
High school football venues in Texas
2008 establishments in Texas
Sports venues completed in 2008
Buildings and structures in Montgomery County, Texas